The Old Museum Building is a heritage-listed former exhibition building, former museum and now performance venue in Bowen Hills, Brisbane, Queensland, Australia. It is made from 1.3 million red bricks and bordered by Gregory Terrace and the Exhibition Grounds.

History

The Old Museum was originally called the Exhibition Building and Concert Hall. It was built in 1891 for the Queensland National Agricultural and Industrial Association after Brisbane's first exhibition building, which had occupied the land, was destroyed by fire on 13 June 1888. At the time of the fire the building was being used as a skating rink.

The land had been used by the Queensland Acclimatisation Society from 1863-1875.

The new exhibition building was designed by the architect George Henry Male Addison (1857–1922). The style of the building may best be described as progressive eclecticism or Indo-Saracenic. The edifice was built over a period of 12 months by over 300 workers. It is entered in the Queensland Heritage Register.

The Queensland Government took over control of the building and grounds when the National Association was forced into liquidation by the economic depression in 1897.

In 1899, the Exhibition Hall became home to the Queensland Museum, with the museum remaining in the building until the museum's relocation to the Queensland Cultural Centre in 1986. During the Queensland Museum's 86 years in the building, other parts of the building were used as a Concert Hall and an Art Gallery. Because of the Queensland Museum's long occupancy of the building, the building is now known as the Old Museum.

In 2016, the building was taken back for Ekka and has since been used for the flower and garden displays.

Performance venue
The Old Museum building is home to the Queensland Youth Orchestras, who use the building as a rehearsal, performance and office space. The building is also home for the Brisbane Symphony Orchestra, Brisbane Philharmonic Orchestra, Queensland Youth Choir, Queensland Wind and Brass, Brisbane River City Clippers Barbershop Chorus, Queensland Rhythmic Gymnastics Organisation, Queensland Police Pipes and Drums and the Zen Zen Zo Physical Theatre Company.

The play Troilus and Cressida by William Shakespeare, was also presented in the Old Museum building in 1989. Members of the cast included Geoffrey Rush, Jane Menelaus and Russell Dykstra.

The Old Museum building was also used as one of the sites for the 1980s Australian series of Mission: Impossible.

Photographs of the Old Museum

Heritage listing
The building was listed on the Queensland Heritage Register on 21 October 1992.

In 2009 as part of the Q150 celebrations, the Old Museum Building was announced as one of the Q150 Icons of Queensland for its role as a "structure and engineering feat".

References

External links

The Exhibition Grounds and Buildings - includes information about the Old Museum building
the Old Museum Building
"Troilus and Cressida" at the Old Museum Building
Brisbane Symphany Orchestra
Old Museum Discover Queensland Building

Bowen Hills, Queensland
Music venues in Australia
Museums in Brisbane
Defunct museums in Australia
History of Brisbane
Queensland Heritage Register
Buildings and structures completed in 1891
Brick buildings and structures
GHM Addison buildings
Federation style architecture
Romanesque Revival architecture in Australia
Q150 Icons